The 1927 SANFL Grand Final was an Australian rules football competition.  beat  71 to 64.

References 

SANFL Grand Finals
SANFL Grand Final, 1927